The Club de Ciervos Fútbol Club, is a Mexican football club based in Chalco de Díaz Covarrubias. The club was founded in 2008, and currently plays in the Serie B of Liga Premier.

History
The team was founded on August 23, 2008 as Vikingos de Chalco, from its foundation until 2016 they competed in the Third Division of Mexico. Before starting the 2016-17 season, the team was invited to the Liga de Nuevos Talentos to cover the abandonment of the Club Picudos de Manzanillo.

In 2017 the team was renamed as Ciervos F.C. In 2018 the name of the team was modified slightly, going to be called Club de Ciervos F.C., in addition, a reserve team was created to compete in the Third Division.

At the end of the 2020–21 season, the club began a remodeling of its structure due to the poor sporting results of the institution during the football cycle, for this reason, on May 22, 2021 the club was renamed Chalco F.C., however, because the change was not made official before the FMF, the team continued to compete under the name Club de Ciervos. Finally, after the end of the 2021–22 season, the team did not carry out the name change procedures, so it remained with the original name.

Players

Current squad

Reserve teams
Chalco (Liga TDP)
Reserve team that plays in the Liga TDP, the fourth level of the Mexican league system.

References

External links 

Association football clubs established in 2008
Football clubs in the State of Mexico
2008 establishments in Mexico
Liga Premier de México